A grapefruit spoon is a utensil usually similar in design to a teaspoon that tapers to a sharp edge or teeth, the intent of the front serration being to separate the flesh of a grapefruit from its rind. Also called an orange spoon, citrus spoon, and fruit spoon, it is used for other citrus fruits, as well as kiwifruit and melons.

A variation of the design has a blunt front edge with serrated sides, enabling the user to dig the spoon into the fruit before using the serrated side edges as a knife to separate the flesh from the rind.

These spoons are not generally found in most cutlery sets but may be purchased separately.

See also
 Grapefruit knife
 Spife
 Spork
 Splayd
 List of types of spoons

References

Grapefruit
Spoons